Mordellistena kaguyahime is a beetle in the genus Mordellistena of the family Mordellidae. It was described in 1957 by Nomura & Kato.

References

kaguyahime
Beetles described in 1957